Robert Charles "Charley" Hughlett (born May 16, 1990) is an American football long snapper for the Cleveland Browns of the National Football League (NFL). He played college football at UCF.

Early years
Hughlett attended Hillsborough High School in Tampa, Florida, where he lettered all four years at tight end and center. He graduated in the Class of 2008. As a junior, he was named second-team All-conference. As a senior, he received first-team All-conference honors.

During his high school career, the Terriers earned regional champion honors in 2004 as well as district titles in 2005 and 2006. Hughlett also earned varsity letters in track and wrestling. He was also selected for the National Football Foundation Scholar-Athlete Award.

College career
In 2008, he accepted a football scholarship from the University of Central Florida. He also was recruited by The Citadel, South Florida, Holy Cross, and Brown. He played long snapper all four years.

As a freshman, he earned Conference USA All-Freshman Team honors as a long snapper, after appearing in 12 games, including 3 tackles on special teams. As a sophomore, he played in all 13 of the Knights games. 

As a junior, Hughlett appeared in all 14 of the Knights games en route to earning All-Conference USA second-team honors. As a senior, he played in all 12 games and again earned All-Conference USA second-team honors.

Professional career

Dallas Cowboys
Hughlett was signed as an undrafted free agent by the Dallas Cowboys after the 2012 NFL Draft on April 30. On August 27, 2012, he was waived after not being able to pass stalwart starter L.P. Ladouceur on the depth chart. On January 7, 2013, he was re-signed. On May 29, 2013, he was released.

2014 season
On March 19, 2014, he signed as a free agent with the New England Patriots. On May 15, 2014, he was released. On June 19, 2014, he was signed by the Jacksonville Jaguars. On August 24, 2014, he was released.

On September 1, 2014, he was signed to the Patriots' practice squad, only to be released two days later. On September 30, 2014, he was signed to the Cleveland Browns' practice squad, but was cut a week later. On November 26, 2014, he was re-signed to the Patriots' practice squad and was released two days later. On December 16, 2014, he was signed to the Kansas City Chiefs' practice squad.

Cleveland Browns (second stint)
On December 24, 2014, Hughlett was signed to the Browns active roster off the Chiefs' practice squad, to compete with starter Christian Yount.

In 2015, he passed Yount on the depth chart. He played in all 16 games and handling all long-snapping duties. On February 16, 2017, Hughlett signed a six-year contract extension with the Browns, which at the time made him the league's highest-paid long snapper. On October 3, 2021, he played in his 100th consecutive game with the Browns, becoming only the third player (Joe Thomas and Phil Dawson) to accomplish this feat since the franchise returned to the NFL in 1999.

On October 28, 2022, Hughlett signed a four-year contract extension with the Browns.

References

External links
UCF Knights bio
NFL career transactions

Living people
1990 births
American football long snappers
Dallas Cowboys players
New England Patriots players
Jacksonville Jaguars players
Cleveland Browns players
Kansas City Chiefs players
UCF Knights football players
Players of American football from Tampa, Florida